These are the Canadian number-one albums of 2001. The chart is compiled by Nielsen Soundscan and published by Jam! Canoe, issued every Sunday. The chart also appears in Billboard magazine as Top Canadian Albums.

See also
List of Canadian number-one singles of 2001

References

External links
Billboard Top Canadian Albums

2001
2001 record charts
2001 in Canadian music